Nick George may refer to:
 Nick George (basketball) (born 1982), British basketball player
 Nick George, author of comic book stories and animation scripts; see Working for Peanuts
 Nick George (fictional character), a character in the American television series Dirty Sexy Money